The O'Reilly Open Source Convention (OSCON) was an American annual convention for the discussion of free and open-source software. It was organized by publisher O'Reilly Media and was held each summer, mostly in Portland, Oregon, from 1999 to 2019.

History
OSCON grew out of The Perl Conference, but the amount of Perl content has continued to decline each year. The first Perl Conference took place in 1997. The first OSCON was held in 1999.

Notable events
 The OpenOffice.org open source project was announced at the 2000 conference in Monterey. 
 The OpenStack open source project was launched at the 2010 conference. 
 OSCON has been the host to Larry Wall's State of the Onion keynotes.
 All O'Reilly events were cancelled in response to the COVID-19 pandemic, and the company closed the in-person conference portion of their business.

Layout
Throughout the week in which OSCON is hosted, there are workshops and presentations, most of which are conducted in meeting rooms. These sessions are primarily focused on the use and development of upcoming and current open source software, and there are usually a few sessions addressing the open source community itself. In the past few years, the main topics have been cloud computing, distributed computing, virtualization, minimizing downtime, big data, and information technology. Certain sessions are sponsored by companies and are free and open to the public.

During the convention, OSCON throws various parties for the attendees. Many of these are sponsored, with some parties being held at sponsoring companies' facilities throughout the city.

At the OSCON expo, vendors and other organizations showcase their latest innovations, offer short classes, give away swag, and answer questions about their products. Some companies that have had larger booths over the years include Linode, Rackspace, HP, Bluehost, and Microsoft.

Tables are usually set up outside the meeting rooms where attendees can rest or work. There is also a sponsored "hack zone" outside the Expo Hall where attendees may use fast networking and power strips to hack, socialize, or take a break. Through the main hallway, there is usually a large black box referred to as "The Chalkboard", where attendees can use chalk to scribble logos, slogans, names, and ideas.

Locations

See also
List of free-software events

References

External links
 , oscon.com

Open Source Convention
Free-software conferences
Articles containing video clips